San i java is the second compilation album by the Serbian garage rock/punk rock band Partibrejkers, released by Hi-Fi Centar in 1999.

Track listing

Notes 
 Tracks 1 to 3 from Partibrejkers I
 Tracks 4 to 6 from Partibrejkers II
 Tracks 7 to 10 from Partibrejkers III
 Tracks 11 to 13 from Kiselo i slatko
 Tracks 13 to 15 from Najbolje od najgoreg
 Tracks 16 and 18 from Ledeno doba
 Tracks 19 and 20 previously unreleased, recorded in 1999 at the Music Factory studio, Belgrade

References 
 San i java at Discogs

1999 compilation albums
Partibrejkers compilation albums
Hi-Fi Centar compilation albums